Delta Indi, Latinized from δ Indi, is a binary star system in the southern constellation of Indus. It is visible to the naked eye with a combined apparent visual magnitude of +4.40. The brighter primary, designated component A, is magnitude 4.80 while the companion, component B, is magnitude 5.96. Based upon an annual parallax shift of 14.07 mas as measured from Earth, the system is located about 188 light years from the Sun.

The binary nature of this system was discovered by South African astronomer William Stephen Finsen from 1936 onward, with his published orbital elements appearing in 1956. The pair have an orbital period of 12.2 years, a semimajor axis of 0.176 arc seconds, and an eccentricity of around 0.03. Both components have been listed with a stellar classification of F0 IV by multiple authors, suggesting they are yellow-white hued F-type subgiant stars. However, their estimated masses don't match this classification, so Docobo and Andrade (2013) suggest the Hipparcos parallax may have been underestimated.

References

F-type subgiants
Binary stars
Indus (constellation)
Indi, Delta
Durchmusterung objects
208450
108431
8368